Santa Fiora is a comune (municipality) in the Province of Grosseto, in the Italian region of Tuscany, located about  southeast of Florence and about  east of Grosseto. Santa Fiora borders the following municipalities: Abbadia San Salvatore, Arcidosso, Castel del Piano, Castell'Azzara, Piancastagnaio, Roccalbegna, Semproniano.

History

Santa Fiora is mentioned for the first time in 890 AD, in a document listing properties of the Abbey of San Salvatore, Sforza Cesarini Archive Rome. By the eleventh century the lords of Santa Fiore were the Aldobrandeschi who, in 1082, started the construction of a castle here (Castello S. Flore) and walled the borgo. The power of the abbey passed by degrees to the Aldobrandeschi conti di San Fire, and in turn to the hegemony in Lower Tuscany of the commune of Siena, which was strong influence on Santa Fiora by the mid fourteenth century, a future already foreseen by Dante: "e vedrai Santafior com' è oscura", "and you shall see how obscure is Santa Fiore" (Purgatorio, canto VI, 111). In 1439, with the marriage of Cecilia Aldobrandeschi and Bosio Sforza, the castello and its town passed to the Sforza.

The Sforza of Santa Fiora reached their highest point of power with count Guido Sforza di Santa Fiora, who managed to establish himself as a relative of Pope Paul III Farnese, thereby gaining prestigious political positions for his relatives. Later the family became the Sforza Cesarini, who are still well represented and living in their Roman Palazzo Sforza Cesarini. The sovereign rights of the small state of Santa Fiora were sold to the Grand Duchy of Tuscany under Leopold II though all feudal rights remained to the family.

The comune was of importance for its mineral wealth in Monte Amiata of cinnabar, from which mercury is derived.

In the Middle Ages and during the modern era Santa Fiora was the capital of an independent state, the County of Santa Fiora.

Frazioni 
The municipality is formed by the municipal seat of Santa Fiora and the villages (frazioni) of Bagnolo, Bagnore, Marroneto and Selva.

Main sights

Churches 
 Pieve of Sante Flora e Lucilla
 Church of San Giuseppe
 Church of Suffragio
 Church of Sant'Agostino
 Church of Santa Chiara
 Church of Madonna delle Nevi
 Church of San Rocco, midway between Santa Fiora and the village of Marroneto
 Church of Santissimo Nome di Maria in the village of Bagnolo
 Church of Nostra Signora del Sacro Cuore in the village of Bagnore
 Convent of Santissima Trinità between Santa Fiora and the village of Selva

Palazzi 
 Palazzo Sforza Cesarini, built in 1575 over the Aldobrandeschi castle (of which two medieval towers still can be seen).
 Palazzo Pretorio
 Palazzo Luciani

Others 
 Museum of mercury mines of Monte Amiata
 Peschiera of Santa Fiora

Notable people 
 Candido Amantini, Catholic priest and exorcist
 Ernesto Balducci, Roman Catholic priest and peace activist
 Laura Morante, actress 
 Mario Pratesi, writer
 Valerio Valeri, Roman Catholic cardinal

References

External links

 Official website